Kathy L. Sykes (born June 29, 1963) is an American politician who served as a member of the Mississippi House of Representatives for the 42nd district from 2016 to 2020. She is a member of the Democratic party.

References

1963 births
Living people
Republican Party members of the Mississippi House of Representatives